This is a list of earthquakes in 1975. Only earthquakes of magnitude 6 or above are included, unless they result in damage and/or casualties, or are notable for some other reason.  All dates are listed according to UTC time. Maximum intensities are indicated on the Mercalli intensity scale and are sourced from United States Geological Survey (USGS) ShakeMap data. The year was characterized by several large events which helped bring the number of magnitude 7.0+ events to 13. Six events were larger than the biggest event of 1974. Two events reached magnitude 7.9. Turkey had the deadliest event with 2,300 lives being lost in September. China had an earthquake in February which resulted in 2,000 deaths.

By death toll

Listed are earthquakes with at least 10 dead.

By magnitude

Listed are earthquakes with at least 7.0 magnitude.

By month

January

February

March

April

May

June

July

August

September

October

November

December

References

1975
 
1975